Lolani Koko is a Samoan former rugby union and rugby league footballer who played in the 1980s and 1990s. He played representative rugby union for Samoa and representative rugby league for Western Samoa, including at the 1995 Rugby League World Cup.

Rugby union career
Koko played for the Samoa national rugby union team, making his debut in 1983. He moved to New Zealand in the early 1990s, playing for Wellington. He was invited to trial for the All Blacks but decided to stick with his native Samoa. Koko scored 11 tries for Wellington in the 1992 NPC season. He was named the Man of Honour at the 1993 Hong Kong Sevens.

Koko also spent time with the Boroondara Rugby Club in Australia.

Rugby league career
Koko switched to rugby league at the start of the 1995 season. Koko joined the Sydney City Roosters in the Australian Rugby League competition and led the Western Samoa team at the 1995 World Sevens Koko also had a stint with the Narrandera Lizards in Group 20 Rugby League.

He was part of the Western Samoa squad at the 1995 World Cup.

Personal life
Koko's brother Kofe Koko also represented Samoa in rugby union and his nephew Ali Koko also represented both Samoa and Wellington in rugby union.

References
Lolani Koko international stats

Living people
Samoan rugby league players
Samoa national rugby league team players
Samoan rugby union players
Expatriate rugby union players in New Zealand
Samoan expatriate rugby union players
Samoan expatriate sportspeople in New Zealand
Samoa international rugby sevens players
Dual-code rugby internationals
Rugby league wingers
1963 births
Samoa international rugby union players
Wellington rugby union players